Fairly Legal is an American legal comedy-drama television series which aired on USA Network from January 20, 2011, to June 15, 2012. The series starred Sarah Shahi, Michael Trucco, Virginia Williams, Baron Vaughn, and Ryan Johnson. USA Network canceled the show on November 1, 2012, after two seasons, due to low ratings.

Overview
Fairly Legal stars Sarah Shahi as Kate Reed, a young woman who changes her profession from lawyer to mediator and works at the San Francisco law firm her father started. As the series opens, Kate's father has just died, leaving his young widow Lauren in charge as Kate and the firm adjust to the loss.

Kate and Lauren, who are approximately the same age, generally engage in comical banter while attempting to work together, and the development of their relationship is a central focus of the series. According to Shahi, the characters "take a couple steps forward and then take gigantic leaps back". She has also stated that their history divides them at certain times, and bonds them at others. "At the end of the day, they would give the shirt off of their backs to help the other person, because they are family".

Cast and characters

Main
Sarah Shahi as Kate Reed: A top lawyer at her father's firm who, after realizing her own ethical conflict with her profession, becomes an Evaluative Mediator.
Michael Trucco as Justin Patrick: Kate's estranged, and later former, husband, Assistant District Attorney of San Francisco. They continue an on-off relationship, that continues throughout the run of the show.
Virginia Williams as Lauren Reed: Kate's new boss and stepmother. Kate assumes that Lauren's coldness following her husband's death is proof of heartlessness, but Lauren explains that she is simply doing what is necessary to keep the firm from disintegrating in his absence. When Kate mocks her ability to be the boss, Lauren reveals she was actually running the firm in the last few years of her husband's life. Kate doesn't believe it at first, but Lauren does her best to keep the firm afloat after several of their clients go bankrupt.
Ryan Johnson as Ben Grogan (season 2): Kate's partner and nemesis at Reed & Reed; he is a former ambulance chaser who loves money and winning.  Later, he begins to partner more with Kate and becomes a potential love interest.  
Baron Vaughn as Leonardo "Leo" Prince: Kate's assistant. Enthusiastic, resourceful, and a passionate fantasy gamer. He has a knack for keeping the at-times flighty Kate out of trouble with clients and Lauren.

Recurring
Richard Dean Anderson as David Smith: A man with many secrets who enters Kate's life after the death of her father.
 Ethan Embry as Spencer: Kate's brother, who was formerly a lawyer at the family firm. Spencer is now a stay-at-home father while his wife Terry works.  
 Gerald McRaney as Judge David Nicastro: a judge who dislikes Kate for her turning to mediation, but uses her to mediate some of his cases.

 Devon Weigel as Kim (Season 1): A sandwich girl who works at Reed & Reed. She and Leonardo eventually begin dating.

Development and production
Fairly Legal first appeared on the development slate for USA Network in August 2009, under the working title Facing Kate. The series was created and written by Michael Sardo, who also serves as an executive producer. Casting announcements began in late October, when Sarah Shahi was cast in the main role of Kate Reed. Michael Trucco and Virginia Williams joined the cast in early November.

The 75-minute pilot episode was directed by Bronwen Hughes. The series was given the green-light for a first season on March 15, 2010, with an additional 11 episode order. Production began in June in Vancouver, British Columbia, Canada. In September, the total number of episodes was cut from twelve to ten due to scheduling issues.

On May 2, 2011, USA Network announced that Fairly Legal had been renewed for a second season of 13 episodes, which went into production later in 2011. On January 4, 2012, it was announced the second season of Fairly Legal would premiere on March 16, 2012. The series moved to Friday at 9:00 pm, paired with In Plain Sight.

Music
The theme song, "The Yellow Brick Road Song", is performed by spoken word poet and musician Iyeoka Okoawo. Co-written by producer David Franz, it is the lead single from her album Say Yes.

Episodes

Season 1 (2011)

Season 2 (2012)
On May 2, 2011, USA announced that Fairly Legal was renewed for a 13-episode second and final season, which premiered on March 16 and ended June 15, 2012.  Production for the season began on October 28, 2011.  The season has seen the introduction of a new series regular, Ryan Johnson as Ben Grogan.  Mark Moses appeared in one episode as a powerful attorney.  Barry Shabaka Henley appeared in the second episode as an agent "who isn't afraid to play rough."  Meat Loaf appeared in the ninth episode as Charlie DeKay, a union boss who threatens to institute a strike in San Francisco.

Broadcast
In Australia, the series premiered on Seven Network on July 10, 2012, and returned for season two on May 26, 2013.

Home media 

Reception

Critical response
Writing for Entertainment Weekly, Darren Franich noted the similarity in formula of Fairly Legal to other successful USA Network series and described the show as "a perfectly prefabricated USA treat". He lauded Shahi's performance as Kate, saying she "makes you believe that the woman is simultaneously an anxious wreck and a brilliant mediator", and applauded some of the "interesting chances" the creators took. However, he took the show to task for not utilizing its San Francisco setting as well as other USA series use their locales and chided Fairly Legal for not knowing "whether it wants to be a somber drama or a zippy legal quirkfest". Robert Bianco for USA Today concurred in the assessment of Shahi's performance, calling it "instantly likable", and described the series as "a well-constructed piece of popular entertainment from a dependable provider of the same, with an easy-to-like star and an easy-to-grasp premise". In a review of Season 2, Bruce Fretts of TV Guide commended Williams and applauded the relationship between Lauren and Kate, noting its effect on character development.

Ratings
Fairly Legal attracted 3.9 million viewers upon first airing, with approximately one-third of viewers being in the key 18–49 ratings demographic. The episode lost about 500,000 viewers from its lead-in, the mid-season debut of the medical drama Royal Pains.

References

External links 
 
 Interview with Writer/Producer Michael Sardo at Abnormal Use
 

2010s American comedy-drama television series
2011 American television series debuts
2012 American television series endings
English-language television shows
2010s American legal television series
Television series by Universal Television
Television shows set in San Francisco
USA Network original programming
Television shows filmed in Vancouver